This is a list of diseases of foliage plants belonging to the family Cactaceae.

Plant Species

Bacterial diseases

Fungal diseases

Nematodes, parasitic

Viral diseases

References
Common Names of Diseases, The American Phytopathological Society

Foliage plant (Cactaceae)